Burch Taylor Smith (born April 12, 1990) is an American professional baseball pitcher for the Hanwha Eagles of the Korea Baseball Organization (KBO). Smith was drafted by the San Diego Padres in the 11th round of the 2011 Major League Baseball draft. He made his MLB debut in 2013. He previously played in Major League Baseball (MLB) for the San Diego Padres, Kansas City Royals, Milwaukee Brewers, San Francisco Giants, and Oakland Athletics and in Nippon Professional Baseball (NPB) for the Saitama Seibu Lions.

Amateur career
Smith attended Robert E. Lee High School in Tyler, Texas. Pitching for the baseball team, in his high school career he was 11–3 with a 1.68 ERA and 153 strikeouts in 150 innings.

At Howard College, Smith's team was the 2009 NCJAA National Champion as he was 4–0 with a 3.05 ERA, and he was named the 2010 Western Junior College Athletic Conference Pitcher of the Year, after going 11–2 with a 2.50 ERA.  Smith was drafted by the Cleveland Indians in the 49th round of the 2009 Major League Baseball draft and the 20th round of the 2010 Major League Baseball draft out of Howard, but did not sign either time.  He then attended the University of Oklahoma as a junior, going 10–4, and was 2011 All-Big 12 honorable mention.

Professional career

San Diego Padres
The San Diego Padres selected Smith in the 11th round of the 2011 Major League Baseball draft; he signed for a signing bonus of $250,000.

Pitching for the Class A Advanced Lake Elsinore Storm in 2012, Smith went 9–6 with a 3.85 earned run average and 137 strikeouts. He started the 2013 season with the Double-A San Antonio Missions. He was named the Texas League Pitcher of the Week in April 2013, and the Padres Minor League Pitcher of the Month for April with a 1.38 ERA over five starts. Smith made his Major League debut Saturday, May 11, 2013, against the Tampa Bay Rays as he was called up from Double-A.

In his Major League debut, Smith pitched a clean first inning, striking out his first two batters, but he did not record an out in the second, giving up six earned runs on five hits. He was sent down to the Tucson Padres of the Triple-A Pacific Coast League (PCL) on May 22 after allowing 15 earned runs in three starts. He was recalled on June 8, but did not make an appearance before he was optioned back to Tucson on June 10.  He came back to the Major League club on June 28 after posting a 2.54 ERA in five starts overall with Tucson.  Smith joined the bullpen where he made three appearances before being sent down again on July 5.

Smith made seven more starts for Tucson, striking out 10 in his final appearance, and then returned to the Padres' rotation with the September roster expansion.  He made four more starts for the Padres in 2013, allowing 10 runs with 31 strikeouts.

Tampa Bay Rays
On December 19, 2014, the Padres traded Smith, Jake Bauers, and René Rivera to the Tampa Bay Rays in a three-team trade that saw the Rays trade Wil Myers, Jose Castillo and Ryan Hanigan to the Padres, the Padres trade Joe Ross and a player to be named later to the Washington Nationals, and Washington trade Steven Souza and Travis Ott to Tampa Bay. Smith missed the 2015 season after having Tommy John surgery. Smith was outrighted following the 2015 season.

Kansas City Royals
The New York Mets selected Smith in the Rule 5 draft on December 14, 2017, and immediately traded him to the Kansas City Royals for cash considerations. After a strong spring training, Smith was chosen as a member of the bullpen for Opening Day. In 2018 with Kansas City he was 1–6 with a 6.92 ERA in 38 games (6 starts), in which he pitched 78 innings.

On November 26, 2018, Smith was designated for assignment.

Milwaukee Brewers
On January 11, 2019, Smith signed a minor league contract with the Milwaukee Brewers. He was assigned to the San Antonio Missions of the PCL to start the 2019 season, for whom he was 6–3 with a 2.33 ERA in 15 starts, in which he pitched  innings and struck out 85 batters. He had his contract selected to the major leagues on May 5. With the Brewers, he was 0–1 with a 7.82 ERA in  innings. On August 9, Smith was designated for assignment.

San Francisco Giants
On August 12, 2019, Smith was claimed off waivers by the San Francisco Giants. With the Sacramento River Cats of the PCL, he was 1–1 with a 4.20 ERA in 15 innings in which he struck out 18 batters. With the Giants, he was 0–0 with a 2.08 ERA in eight innings. Smith was designated for assignment by the Giants on February 10, 2020.

Oakland Athletics
On February 15, 2020, the Giants traded Smith to the Oakland Athletics in exchange for cash considerations. This trade was the first swap involving a major league player between the Bay Area rivals since December 4, 1990, when the Athletics acquired Ernest Riles from the Giants for Darren Lewis and minor league starting pitcher Pedro Pena.

Smith picked up wins in his first two appearances for the Athletics, in which he allowed two hits and a walk in three scoreless innings combined. He was credited with his first career save on August 7, 2020, by throwing the last three innings of a 7–2 win over the Houston Astros, during which he allowed only one hit and no runs. On August 17, Smith was placed on the 10-day injured list with a forearm strain, two days after surrendering his first runs of the season to his former team, the Giants, on a three-run home run. In 6 games for the A's, Smith registered an ERA of 2.25 in 12 innings.

Smith pitched in 31 games for Oakland in 2021, going 1-1 with a 5.40 ERA and 28 strikeouts. On September 14, 2021, the A's designated Smith for assignment.
On October 12, Smith elected free agency.

Saitama Seibu Lions
On January 18, 2022, Smith signed with the Saitama Seibu Lions of Nippon Professional Baseball (NPB).

Hanwha Eagles
On December 18, 2022, Smith signed with the Hanwha Eagles of the Korea Baseball Organization.

References

External links

Oklahoma Sooners bio

1990 births
Living people
Sportspeople from Tyler, Texas
Baseball players from Texas
Major League Baseball pitchers
San Diego Padres players
Kansas City Royals players
Milwaukee Brewers players
San Francisco Giants players
Oakland Athletics players
Howard Hawks baseball players
Oklahoma Sooners baseball players
Arizona League Padres players
Lake Elsinore Storm players
San Antonio Missions players
Tucson Padres players
El Paso Chihuahuas players
Surprise Saguaros players
Gulf Coast Rays players
Charlotte Stone Crabs players
Durham Bulls players
Sacramento River Cats players
Las Vegas Aviators players
Nippon Professional Baseball pitchers
Saitama Seibu Lions players